The Watcher is an American mystery thriller television series created by Ryan Murphy and Ian Brennan for Netflix. It premiered on October 13, 2022. It is loosely based on a 2018 article by Reeves Wiedeman for New York magazine's website, "The Cut." Despite being originally conceived as a miniseries, The Watcher was renewed for a second season in November 2022.

Premise
The series follows a married couple who, after moving into their dream home in a fictionalized version of Westfield, New Jersey, are harassed by creepy letters signed by a stalker who goes by the pseudonym "The Watcher".

Cast and characters

Main 
 Naomi Watts as Nora Brannock
 Bobby Cannavale as Dean Brannock
 Isabel Gravitt as Ellie Brannock
 Luke David Blumm as Carter Brannock
 Jennifer Coolidge as Karen Calhoun
 Margo Martindale as Maureen / Mo
 Richard Kind as Mitch (season 1)
 Mia Farrow as Pearl Winslow
 Terry Kinney as Jasper Winslow
 Christopher McDonald as Det. Rourke Chamberland
 Noma Dumezweni as Theodora Birch (season 1)
 Joe Mantello as William "Bill" Webster / John Graff
 Henry Hunter Hall as Dakota

Recurring 
 Michael Nouri as Roger Kaplan
 Danny Garcia as Steve
 Seth Gabel as Andrew Pierce
 Susan Merson as Tammy
 Seth Barrish as Jack
 Michael Devine as Christopher
 Stephanie Kurtzuba as Helen Graff
 Matthew Del Negro as Darren Dunn
 Jeffrey Brooks as Police Officer
 Patricia Black as Marjorie
 Kate Skinner as Trish
 Anthony Bowden as Young Roger
 Pamela Dunlap as Carol Flanagan
 Brittany Bradford as Nina
 Jeff Hiller as Therapist

Episodes

Season 1 (2022)

Production 
The series is based on a 2018 article for New York "The Cut" by Reeves Wiedeman, which chronicled the experience of Derek and Maria Broaddus after they received threatening letters upon moving into their home at 657 Boulevard in Westfield, New Jersey in 2014, which continued until they sold the home in 2019. The character John Graff was based on John List, a mass murderer and longtime fugitive who murdered his family in his Westfield home in 1971. Similarities between John Graff's character and the List murders include his career as an accountant, attending Lutheran church, and murdering his family members and live-in mother, along with leaving music playing in the house and planning an alibi that would cause the bodies to remain undiscovered for several weeks. 

On-location scenes for the home at 657 Boulevard were filmed at a private residence in Rye, New York that was built in 2016. The scenes where the Brannock family stays at a motel were filmed at an operating motel located in the hamlet of Locust Valley on Long Island, New York.

While no scenes were filmed at the real-life 657 Boulevard residence in Westfield, the neighborhood received increased attention from visitors and fans following the release of the series; the home was guarded by police and barricade tape to prevent trespassers in October 2022.

Reception

The review aggregator website Rotten Tomatoes reported a 56% approval rating with an average rating of 5.5/10, based on 34 critic reviews. The website's critics consensus reads, "This suburban nightmare sometimes achieves the campy fright of creator Ryan Murphy's best horror fare, but it sprawls in too many ludicrous directions to satisfy." Metacritic, which uses a weighted average, assigned a score of 54 out of 100 based on 8 critics, indicating "mixed or average reviews".

Daniel D'Addario of Variety summarized the show as "ultimately unremarkable fiction."

References

External links 
 
 

2020s American drama television series
2020s American mystery television series
2020s American horror television series
2022 American television series debuts
American thriller television series
English-language Netflix original programming
Horror drama television series
Television series about families
Television series based on actual events
Television series based on Internet-based works
Television series created by Ryan Murphy (writer)
Television shows set in Manhattan
Television shows set in New Jersey
Works about stalking